JUB may refer to:
JUB (gene), gene for a human protein that is part of many complexes
Jacobs University Bremen, a private research university in Germany
Jaiminiya Upanishad Brahmana, a Vedic text
Juba Airport in South Sudan (IATA code)

See also 
 Jub Jub (disambiguation)
 Jubb (disambiguation)
 Jab (disambiguation)